Cynic Paradise is the sixth studio album by the Swedish industrial metal project Pain, released on 31 October 2008 via Nuclear Blast. It reached No. 30 on the Swedish album charts.

The album features a duet with then-Nightwish singer Anette Olzon in the songs "Follow Me" and "Feed Us". Disc 2 features a Depeche Mode cover and remixes. The artwork was created by renowned artist Travis Smith (Devin Townsend, Amorphis, Opeth, Nevermore).

The North American version was released on 8 June 2010 with bonus live disc and alternative cover.

Critical reception

In a review for AllMusic, Alex Henderson described the album as "an engaging disc even though it doesn't pretend to break any new ground for industrial metal."

Track listing
"I'm Going In" – 3:16
"Monkey Business" – 4:05
"Follow Me" (feat. Anette Olzon) – 4:17
"Have a Drink on Me" – 3:53
"Don't Care" – 2:42
"Reach Out (and Regret)" – 3:55
"Generation X" – 4:18
"No One Knows" – 3:50
"Live Fast / Die Young" – 3:42
"Not Your Kind" – 4:10
"Feed Us" (feat. Anette Olzon) – 4:14

Bonus tracks
"Behind the Wheel" (Depeche Mode cover) – 4:09
"Here Is the News" (Electric Light Orchestra cover) – 3:52
"Follow Me (Peter Vox Version)" – 4:08
"Clouds of Ecstasy Bassflow Remix)" – 3:29
"No One Knows (Rectifier Remix)" – 3:45

Spinefarm Records UK
"Follow Me" (Peter Vox Version)" – 4:08
"Clouds of Ecstasy (Bassflow Remix)" – 3:29
"No One Knows (Rectifier Remix)" – 3:45
"Trapped" – 3:40

Charts

References

Pain (musical project) albums
2008 albums
Nuclear Blast albums
Albums produced by Peter Tägtgren
Albums with cover art by Travis Smith (artist)